Aristides Pérez Torres (born May 20, 1981) is a professional Colombian boxer in the Lightweight division and is the former Colombian National Featherweight champion.

Pro career

Colombia Featherweight Championship
In April 2008, Aristides beat the undefeated Luis Carlos Martinez to win the Colombian National Featherweight championship.

WBC Super Featherweight Championship
On September 15, 2009, Perez was knocked out by WBC Super Featherweight champion Humberto Soto in just two rounds.

References

External links

Lightweight boxers
1981 births
Living people
Sportspeople from Cartagena, Colombia
Colombian male boxers